Hi Diddle Day is a Canadian children's television series which aired on CBC Television from 1969 to 1976.

Premise

This puppet show was set in the community of Crabgrass, with mayor Gertrude Diddle, Basil (a beagle), Durwood (a 900-year-old dragon), Wolfgang (a wolf) and Chico (a crow). The programme's songwriter, Wyn Canty, was featured in the role of a music teacher.

Production

The series was produced in Ottawa. Noreen Young created the puppets for the series and operated these with Johni Keyworth and Stephen Braithwaite.

Scheduling

Hi Diddle Day was initially limited to the Ottawa, Montreal and Maritime CBC stations, airing Fridays at 4:30 p.m. although a special Christmas episode was broadcast on the network 25 December 1969. The following year, it was seen Saturdays at 1:00 p.m. from April until September. By October 1970, Hi Diddle Day was available on the entire network and was broadcast weekly as an after-school series, and also aired Saturdays 1:00 p.m. in May and June 1971. Production ended after the 1975–1976 season, although repeat episodes were broadcast from April to June 1977.

References

External links
 

CBC Television original programming
1969 Canadian television series debuts
1977 Canadian television series endings
Canadian television shows featuring puppetry
Television shows filmed in Ottawa